Kerrin Petty-Nilsson (born 6 January 1970 in Townsend, Vermont, United States), is a US-Swedish cross-country skier. After competing on the cross-country ski team at the University of Vermont, she represented the United States during the 1994 Olympic Winter Games in Lillehammer and in Nagano in 1998. She won the 1998 women's main competition of Vasaloppet. and the unofficial women's competitions in 1994 and 1996.

In 1996, she won the Swedish women's 30 kilometers national championship. and in 1996 and 1997, she won Tjejvasan.

Petty-Nilsson now works as an environment and health-protection inspector of Forshaga Municipality.

Cross-country skiing results
All results are sourced from the International Ski Federation (FIS).

Olympic Games

World Championships

World Cup

Season standings

References

External links

1970 births
Living people
People from Windham County, Vermont
Sportspeople from Vermont
University of Vermont alumni
Vermont Catamounts skiers
Swedish female cross-country skiers
American female cross-country skiers
Cross-country skiers at the 1994 Winter Olympics
Cross-country skiers at the 1998 Winter Olympics
Vasaloppet winners
Olympic cross-country skiers of the United States
IFK Mora skiers
21st-century American women